Sergiu Dorin Negruț (born 1 April 1993) is a Romanian professional footballer who plays as a forward. In his career Negruț also played for teams such as CFR Cluj, Pandurii Târgu Jiu, Beroe Stara Zagora and Kisvárda FC, among others.

Honours

Club
CFR Cluj
Liga I: 2011–12
Cupa României: 2015–16

References

1993 births
Living people
Sportspeople from Cluj-Napoca
Romanian footballers
Association football midfielders
Liga I players
Liga II players
Liga III players
CSM Unirea Alba Iulia players
CS Sportul Snagov players
SCM Râmnicu Vâlcea players
AFC Turris-Oltul Turnu Măgurele players
CS Mioveni players
CFR Cluj players
CS Pandurii Târgu Jiu players
FC Astra Giurgiu players
First Professional Football League (Bulgaria) players
PFC Beroe Stara Zagora players
Kisvárda FC players
CSM Focșani players
Nemzeti Bajnokság I players
Romanian expatriate footballers
Expatriate footballers in Bulgaria
Romanian expatriate sportspeople in Bulgaria
Expatriate footballers in Hungary
Romanian expatriate sportspeople in Hungary